Shyama Charan Gupta (9 February 1945 – 9 April 2021) was an Indian politician from the Bharatiya Janata Party, entrepreneur, and Member of Parliament representing Allahabad (Lok Sabha constituency) in the North Indian state of Uttar Pradesh. He was the founder of Shyama Group of companies, established in 1973.

Early life and education 

Shyama Charan Gupta was born in Unchadih, District Chitrakoot (Uttar Pradesh) on February 9, 1945. He was educated in a nearby village Manikpur till High School, completed Intermediate from Allahabad. His academic qualifications include B.A, LL.B. from Kanpur and Lucknow subsequently.

Political career 
Shyama Charan Gupta contested the parliamentary elections for the first time from Banda as an Independent candidate in 1984 and came third. His second parliamentary election was from Allahabad in 1991 on BJP ticket. He lost to Janata Dal's Saroj Dubey by 5,196 votes. In 1996, he campaigned for Murli Manohar Joshi only to challenge him in 1998 Lok Sabha elections as Samajwadi Party candidate. After losing the poll, he shifted to Banda (Lok Sabha constituency) in 1999 general elections. On 28 August 1989, he was elected as Mayor of Allahabad. He was elected the Mayor of Allahabad after a gap of 19 years, it was a prestigious election which he won as an independent candidate with the support of then Janta Dal. He emerged as a solid and a powerful Baniya Leader of Eastern UP during that time. In 2004, Shyama Charan was elected to the 14th Lok Sabha from Banda parliamentary constituency on the ticket of Samajwadi Party. He unsuccessfully fought from Phulpur in 2009 general election, losing to his Bahujan Samaj Party rival by a margin of less than 15,000 votes. In 2014 general election he won from Allahabad on a BJP ticket.

Gupta dropped hints of his dissatisfaction with Mulayam Singh Yadav’s party when one of his sons joined the Bhartiya Janata Party in January, 2014, reportedly at his insistence. He resigned from Samajwadi Party and joined BJP to contest the 2014 Lok Sabha election from Allahabad. He won the elections getting 313,772 votes, a margin of 62,009 votes over incumbent MP Rewati Raman Singh of the SP.
He was a member in the Committee on Finance, Committee for the Ministry of Mines & Steel, Committee on Subordinate Legislation.
Also previously during his tenure as Member of Parliament from Banda, between 2004 and 2009, he was on the Standing Committee of Finance and on the Consultative Committee of Food Processing.

Business career 
He established Shyama Group of companies in 1973, which was involved in Bidi manufacturing and has stakes in hospitality and real estate sectors.

Personal life 
Shyama Charan Gupta was married to Jamunotri Gupta.

He died from COVID-19 on 9 April 2021, aged 76.

References

External links
 Official Biography at Parliament of India 
 Profile at Govt. of India website

1945 births
2021 deaths
People from Chitrakoot district
Politicians from Allahabad
People from Banda district, India
India MPs 2004–2009
Samajwadi Party politicians
Lok Sabha members from Uttar Pradesh
India MPs 2014–2019
Bharatiya Janata Party politicians from Uttar Pradesh
Deaths from the COVID-19 pandemic in India